Verda is an unincorporated community in Grant Parish, Louisiana, United States. Verda is east of Montgomery and just past Hargis.

References

Unincorporated communities in Grant Parish, Louisiana
Unincorporated communities in Louisiana